Steven, Stephen, or Steve Morse may refer to:

 A. Stephen Morse (born 1939), American electrical engineering professor
 Stephen A. Morse, inventor of the Morse taper
Stephen J. Morse, American professor of law
 Stephen P. Morse (born 1940), American computer specialist involved with Intel 8086, author of "One Step" genealogy tools
 Stephen Robert Morse, American documentary film maker
 Stephen S. Morse (born 1951), American scientist on emerging infectious diseases
 Steve Morse (born 1954), American musician
 Steven Morse (politician) (born 1957), American politician

See also 
 Morse (surname)